Karl Atzenroth (22 September 1895 – 18 June 1995) was a German businessman and politician from the German Free Democratic Party.

Atzenroth was a member of the  German Bundestag from 1949 to 1965. From 1953 until 12 December 1956, he was Deputy Chairman of the Parliamentary Committee for load balancing, from 20 June 1962 to 1965 Chairman of the Parliamentary Committee for development assistance. From 1957 to 8 January 1963, he was Chairman of the Working Group of economic policies of the FDP.

References

1895 births
1995 deaths
Politicians from Cologne
Members of the Bundestag for Rhineland-Palatinate
Members of the Bundestag 1961–1965
Members of the Bundestag 1957–1961
Members of the Bundestag 1953–1957
Members of the Bundestag 1949–1953
Members of the Bundestag for the Free Democratic Party (Germany)